Jovan Tanasijević (Cyrillic: Јован Танасијевић; born 20 January 1978) is a former Montenegrin international footballer who played as a defender.

Club career
Tanasijević made his senior debut for his hometown side Priština, before transferring to Vojvodina in the 1998 winter transfer window. He spent five years with the club, amassing over 100 appearances in the First League of FR Yugoslavia.

Between 2003 and 2009, Tanasijević played regularly for Russian club Dynamo Moscow, aside from a season-long loan to Rostov in 2006. He also briefly played for Salyut Belgorod in 2010. After a short spell with Inđija in 2011, Tanasijević decided to retire from the game.

International career
Tanasijević represented FR Yugoslavia in January 2001 at the Millennium Super Soccer Cup in India. He helped the team win the tournament, making three appearances in the process.

In March 2007, Tanasijević made his full international debut for Montenegro in his country's first ever competitive match on 24 March 2007, a friendly against Hungary in Podgorica. He was capped 13 times for Montenegro. His final international was a June 2009 FIFA World Cup qualification match away against Cyprus.

References

External links
 
 
 

1978 births
Living people
Sportspeople from Pristina
Association football central defenders
Serbia and Montenegro footballers
Serbia and Montenegro under-21 international footballers
Serbia and Montenegro international footballers
Montenegrin footballers
Montenegro international footballers
Dual internationalists (football)
FC Prishtina players
FK Vojvodina players
FC Dynamo Moscow players
FC Rostov players
FC Salyut Belgorod players
FK Inđija players
Second League of Serbia and Montenegro players
First League of Serbia and Montenegro players
Russian Premier League players
Russian First League players
Serbian SuperLiga players
Serbia and Montenegro expatriate footballers
Expatriate footballers in Russia
Serbia and Montenegro expatriate sportspeople in Russia
Montenegrin expatriate footballers
Montenegrin expatriate sportspeople in Russia